NRG Ensemble was an American free jazz ensemble founded in the late 1970s by saxophonist/multi-instrumentalist Hal Russell.

The group's personnel was somewhat fluid, but included a core of drummer Steve Hunt, saxophonist Mars Williams, guitarist/trumpeter Brian Sandstrom, and bassist Kent Kessler. Their music kept free jazz alive in Chicago throughout the 1980s, when it had largely disappeared from the jazz landscape. Russell was the primary composer, but the other musicians contributed songs as well. Their punning song and album titles (Conserving NRG, Hal on Earth) reflected the humor that permeated Russell's music.

After Russell's death in 1992, the NRG Ensemble recruited saxophonist Ken Vandermark as a replacement, recording three more albums under the leadership of Williams.

Discography 
 NRG Ensemble (Nessa, 1981)
 Generation (Nessa, 1982) - with Charles Tyler
 Conserving NRG (Principally Jazz, 1984)
 Hal on Earth (Abduction, 1989)
 The Finnish/Swiss Tour (ECM, 1991)
 The Hal Russell Story (ECM, 1993)
 Calling All Mothers (Quinnah, 1994)
 This Is My House (Delmark, 1996)
 Bejazzo Gets a Facelift (Atavistic, 1998)

Personnel
Hal Russell (1-6) - Tenor, alto & soprano saxophones, trumpet, cornet, vibraphone, drums, percussion
Chuck Burdelik (1-3) - Tenor & alto saxophones, clarinet, percussion
Curt Bley (1-3) - Acoustic & electric bass
Brian Sandstrom (1-9) – Acoustic bass, electric guitar, trumpet, percussion
Steve Hunt (1-9) – Drums, percussion, vibraphone, didgeridoo
Charles Tyler (2) - Baritone and alto saxophones, clarinet
Mars Williams (4-9) - Tenor, alto, soprano & bass saxophones, didgeridoo
Kent Kessler (4-9) - Acoustic bass, kalimba, didgeridoo, trombone
Ken Vandermark (7-9) - Tenor saxophone, clarinet, bass clarinet

References

Nessa Records artists
Delmark Records artists
American jazz ensembles
Free jazz ensembles
ECM Records artists
Atavistic Records artists